Darrel Ealum (born December 27, 1948) is an American politician who served in the Georgia House of Representatives from the 153rd district from 2015 to 2019.

References

1948 births
Living people
Democratic Party members of the Georgia House of Representatives